Brazel is a surname. It may refer to:

 Gregory Brazel (born 1954), convicted Australian criminal serving three consecutive life sentences
 James Brazel, a judge of the Supreme Court of South Australia
 Jesse Wayne Brazel (1877-1915?), an American cowboy
 William "Mac" Brazel, a witness in the Roswell UFO incident

See also 

 Brazell
 Brazil (disambiguation)